John W. Connolly (July 4, 1911July 11, 1981) was the 48th lieutenant governor of Michigan.

Early life 
Connolly was born in Detroit, Michigan on July 4, 1911. Connolly graduated from Georgetown University Law School in 1936. In 1937, he began work as a lawyer.

Military career 
In 1942, Connolly joined the United States Naval Reserve, where he served until 1946. In the service, he earned the rank of Senior Grade Lieutenant. His work as a lawyer was interrupted by his military service, and he returned to working as a lawyer afterwards.

Political career 
In 1949, Connolly was sworn in as Lieutenant Governor of Michigan, as running mate to G. Mennen Williams. At the end of his term, in 1950, he sought re-election unsuccessfully, and tried again in 1952. Connolly ran for circuit judge in Michigan 3rd Circuit in 1964 and 1966, both runs unsuccessful.

Personal life 
Connolly was a member of both Veterans of Foreign Wars and the American Legion. Connolly was Catholic.

Death 
Connolly died on July 11, 1981 in Detroit.

References 

1911 births
1981 deaths
Military personnel from Detroit
United States Navy personnel of World War II
Michigan lawyers
Michigan Democrats
Catholics from Michigan
Politicians from Detroit
Lieutenant Governors of Michigan
Georgetown University Law Center alumni
20th-century American politicians
20th-century American lawyers